The Campo Santo  of Ghent, Belgium, is a famous Roman Catholic public burial ground in Sint-Amandsberg. The Campo Santo has been declared an historical monument by the government. This cemetery is located in the district of Dampoort.

History 
On top of the hill 19 m , the bishop Philips Erard van der Noot erected in 1720 a chapel, in baroques style in honour of Saint Amandus.
The Roman Catholic bourgeoisie of Ghent favoured this place for important burials: almost all great Catholic families have their graves here. Sited at the top of a hill 19 meters high, it takes its name from the Roman original. The cemetery was opened on 8 December 1847 by Fr Jozef van Damme, the local parish priest. One of the first burials was that of Countess Marie de Hemptinne.

As of 2016 this is still the burial place of famous Catholic artists, nobility and politicians from Ghent.

Famous burials 
 Christine D'haen, poet and author
 Filip De Pillecyn, man of letters
 Jules de Saint-Genois (Jules Ludger, Baron de Saint-Genois des Mottes), archivist, writer and historian
 Luc De Vos, musician, author and Ghent folk hero
 Jan Grauls 
 Joseph Guislain, psychiatrist
 Corneille Heymans
 Jan Hoet
 Karel Lodewijk Ledeganck
 Wilfried Martens
 Frans Masereel, sculptor
 Louis Minard, builder
 Lodewijk Roelandt
 Marc Sleen, cartoonist
 Leo Vindevogel
 Gustave van de Woestijne, artist
 Karel van de Woestijne, author

Not only are some of those who are buried here noteworthy, but also some of the gravestones are the works  of famous sculptors or craftsmen such as Jozef Geefs, Aloïs de Beule and Geo Verbanck. The Campo is thus also well known for its funerary heritage and architecture. 131 graves are protected and listed as valuable.

References

External links 
 Visit.gent.be
 Inventaris
 

Ghent
Cemeteries in Belgium
Catholicism in Belgium